Benjamin Harris Smith Jr. (June 16, 1911 – February 23, 1941) was an American football end in the National Football League (NFL) for the Green Bay Packers, the Pittsburgh Pirates, and the Washington Redskins.  He played college football at the University of Alabama.

Smith worked as an assistant coach for his brother, Earle Smith, at Spring Hill College in 1938. He disappeared on February 23, 1941, while on a fishing trip. His body was discovered 22 days later, on March 17, floating in the Tensaw River near Mobile, Alabama.

References

External links
 

1911 births
1941 deaths
American football ends
Alabama Crimson Tide football players
Green Bay Packers players
Pittsburgh Americans players
Pittsburgh Pirates (football) players
Spring Hill Badgers football coaches
Washington Redskins players
People from Haleyville, Alabama
Players of American football from Alabama
Boating accident deaths
Accidental deaths in Alabama